The 2008–09 Serie A season was the 75th season of the Serie A, the top level of ice hockey in Italy. Eight teams participated in the league, and HC Bolzano won the championship by defeating Ritten Sport in the final.

Regular season

Playoffs

Semifinals

Final

Playdowns

Quarterfinals

Semifinals

Final

External links
 Season on hockeyarchives.info  

2008
Italy
2008–09 in Italian ice hockey